The West Wales Premier League (known for sponsorship reasons as The Macron West Wales Premier League) is a football league in Wales, at tier 4 of the Welsh Football Pyramid in South West Wales under the control of the West Wales Football Association. The league consists of teams having their grounds and headquarters West of a line drawn from Briton Ferry, Neath, northwards to Glynneath, and then again northwards to the boundary line of the South Wales Football Association.  It offers promotion opportunities to the Ardal Leagues, at tier 3 of the Football Association of Wales pyramid.

Its inaugural season was due run in 2020–21 but was cancelled due to the Coronavirus pandemic. It is now due to start on 21 August 2021 with 11 clubs instead of the 12 planned for the 2020–21 season as Ystradgynlais were not part of the fixture list.

League history
Plans for the new league have come about through the Football Association of Wales “2020 vision and strategic plan for Welsh football”. This plan has led to a reorganisation of the Welsh football Pyramid.

The West Wales Premier League will be at tier 4, with initially 11 member clubs. The league champions and runners-up will be eligible for promotion to the Ardal Leagues in South West Wales, should they secure a tier three certificate.

The new league was formed with clubs invited from the Carmarthenshire League, Neath & District League, Pembrokeshire League and Swansea Senior League. Twelve clubs joined the inaugural season of the league, with 4 each from the leagues in Carmarthenshire, Neath and Swansea. Currently no clubs from Pembrokeshire have joined the league.

For the 2022–23 season, the league received three applications to join the league. Ynystawe Athletic from the Swansea Senior League and Clydach FC and Bryn Rovers from the Neath & District League. Each of the clubs needed to meet the Tier 4 ground criteria and finish in the top two of their respective leagues to be promoted., The only one that met this criteria, Clydach joined the league for the 2022–23 season, along with West End, who had been relegated from the Ardal Leagues.

Member clubs for the 2022–23 season 

CK Swiss Valley
Clydach 
Cwm Wanderers
Dafen Welfare
Evans & Williams
Giants Grave
Morriston Town
Penlan Club
Pontarddulais Town
South Gower
West End

Notes

Premier League Champions

2020s

2020-21: Season void
2021-22: Penlan Club

References

External links 
West Wales Premier League Official twitter
West Wales Football Association

Wales
2020 establishments in Wales
Sports leagues established in 2020
Football leagues in Wales